Sender accreditation is a third-party process of verifying email senders and requiring them to adhere to certain accredited usage guidelines in exchange for being listed in a trusted listing that Internet Service Providers (ISPs) reference to allow certain emails to bypass email filters.

Overview
As email usage explodes, so does its abuse. In reaction to abuse such as spam and a more vicious, illegal variation known as phishing, most ISPs have enabled a block list feature to allow users to block specific email senders. Most ISPs have also partnered with spam filtering companies to improve email acceptance, handling, and delivery decisions. Ultimately, their goal is to block unwanted and suspicious types of emails that are either unrecognized or display characteristics of SPAM variants.

Accreditation Lists
These lists use similar technology as block lists to reinforce the original goal of spam filtering companies and ISPs - to improve the accuracy and relevance of email acceptance, handling, and delivery decisions. These lists are intended to help ensure email delivery from legitimate bulk and commercial email senders, and prevent them from being erroneously blocked as "spam".

See also
 Certified email
 Authenticated Email
 Anti-spam techniques (email)
 email filtering

Accreditation Resources
ISIPP

Email